The Caucasus Mountains are a mountain range at the intersection of Asia and Europe.

The Caucasus Mountains include the Greater Caucasus in the north and Lesser Caucasus in the south. The Greater Caucasus runs west-northwest to east-southeast, from the Caucasian Natural Reserve in the vicinity of Sochi, Russia on the northeastern shore of the Black Sea to Baku, Azerbaijan on the Caspian Sea. The Greater and Lesser Caucasus ranges are connected by the Likhi Range, and to the west and east of the Likhi Range lie the Colchis Plain and the Kur-Araz Lowland. The Meskheti Range is a part of the Lesser Caucasus system. In the southeast, the Aras River separates the Lesser Caucasus from the Talysh Mountains which straddles the border of southeastern Azerbaijan and Iran. The Lesser Caucasus and the Armenian Highland constitute the Transcaucasian Highland, which at their western end converges with the highland plateau of Eastern Anatolia in the far north east of Turkey. Mountains near Sochi hosted part of the 2014 Winter Olympics.

Geology
Geologically, the Caucasus Mountains belong to the Alpide belt system that extends from southeastern Europe into Asia and is considered a border between the two continents. The Greater Caucasus Mountains are mainly composed of Cretaceous and Jurassic rocks with the Paleozoic and Precambrian rocks in the higher regions. Some volcanic formations are found throughout the range. On the other hand, the Lesser Caucasus Mountains are formed predominantly of the Paleogene rocks with a much smaller portion of the Jurassic and Cretaceous rocks. The evolution of the Caucasus began from the Late Triassic to the Late Jurassic during the Cimmerian orogeny at the active margin of the Tethys Ocean while the uplift of the Greater Caucasus is dated to the Miocene during the Alpine orogeny.

The Caucasus Mountains formed largely as the result of a tectonic plate collision between the Arabian Plate moving northwards with respect to the Eurasian Plate. As the Tethys Sea was closed and the Arabian Plate collided with the Iranian Plate and was pushed against it and with the clockwise movement of the Eurasian Plate towards the Iranian Plate and their final collision, the Iranian Plate was pressed against the Eurasian Plate. As this happened, the entire rocks that had been deposited in this basin from the Jurassic to the Miocene were folded to form the Greater Caucasus Mountains. This collision also caused the uplift and the Cenozoic volcanic activity in the Lesser Caucasus Mountains.

The entire region is regularly subjected to strong earthquakes from this activity. While the Greater Caucasus Mountains have a mainly folded sedimentary structure, the Lesser Caucasus Mountains are largely of volcanic origin.

The Javakheti Volcanic Plateau in Georgia and the surrounding volcanic ranges which extend well into central Armenia are some of the youngest features of the region. Only recently was the Caucasus a scene for intense volcanic activity: the Armenian highland was flooded by calc-alkaline basalts and andesites in the Pliocene and the highest summits of the Caucasus, the Elbrus, and the Kazbek, formed as Pleistocene-Pliocene volcanoes. The Kazbek is no longer active, but the Elbrus erupted in postglacial times and fumarole activity is registered near its summit. Contemporary seismic activity is a prominent feature of the region, reflecting active faulting and crustal shortening. Clusters of seismicity occur in Dagestan and in northern Armenia. Many devastating earthquakes have been documented in historical times, including the Spitak earthquake in December 1988 which destroyed the Gyumri-Vanadzor region of Armenia.

Notable peaks
However, there are some technical disagreements over whether Mount Elbrus is in Europe. The crest of the Greater Caucasus Mountains is usually taken to define the Greater Caucasus Watershed which marks the continental boundary between Asia and Europe for the region between the Black and Caspian seas. This classification would place Mount Elbrus at the junction with Asia.

The table below lists some of the highest peaks of the Caucasus. With the exception of Shkhara, the heights are taken from Soviet 1:50,000 mapping. The list includes the ten ultras (mountains of more than 1,500 m prominence) and all mountains over 4,500 m height with 300 m prominence. Mount Ararat (5,137 m) in Turkey is just south of the Lesser Caucasus.

{| class = "wikitable"3
 |+ Some of the Highest peaks in the Caucasus Mountains
 |- 
 ! Peak name
 ! Elevation
 ! Prominence
 ! Country
 |-
 | Elbrus ||  || 
 | Russia 
 |-
 | Dykh-Tau ||  || 
 | Russia
 |-
 | Shkhara ||  || 
 | Georgia / Russia  
 |-
 | Koshtan-Tau ||  ||  || Russia 
 |-
 | Pushkin peak||  ||  ||Russia
 |-
 | Janga 
 |  ||  || Georgia / Russia
 |-
 | Mizhirgi||  || 
 | Russia
 |-
 | Kazbek ||  ||  
 | Georgia / Russia
 |-
 | Katyn-Tau ||  || 
 | Georgia / Russia
 |-
 | Kukurtlu Dome||  || 
 | Russia
 |-
 | Gistola ||  || 
 | Georgia / Russia
 |-
 | Shota Rustaveli ||  ||  
 | Georgia / Russia
 |-
 | Tetnuldi ||  || 
 | Georgia
 |-
 | Dzhimara 
 |  ||  || Georgia / Russia
 |-
 | Ushba ||  || 
 | Georgia
 |-
 | Dumala-Tau|| || 
 | Russia
 |-		
 | Gora Uilpata||  || 
 | Russia
 |-
 | Tikhtengen||  || 
 | Georgia / Russia
 |-
 | Ailama ||  || 
 | Georgia / Russia
 |-
 | Tiutiun-Tau ||  || 
 | Russia
 |-
 | Jailik ||  || 
 | Russia
 |-
 | Salinan ||  || 
 | Russia	
 |-
 | Tebulosmta ||  || 
 | Georgia / Russia
 |-
 | Mount Bazardüzü ||  || 
 | Azerbaijan / Russia
 |-
 | Mount Shan ||  ||
 | Georgia / Russia
 |-
 | Tepli ||   || 
 | Russia
 |-
 | Diklo ||  || 
 | Georgia / Russia
 |-
 | Mount Shahdagh ||  || 
 | Azerbaijan
 |-
 | Gora AddalaShukgelmezr
 |  ||  || Russia
 |-
 | Gora Dyultydag ||  || 
 | Russia
 |-
 | Aragats ||  || 
 | Armenia
 |-
 | Deavgay ||  || 
 | Russia
|}

Climate

The climate of the Caucasus varies both vertically (according to elevation) and horizontally (by latitude and location). Temperature generally decreases as elevation rises. The northern slopes of the Greater Caucasus Mountain Range are 3 °C (5.4 °F) colder than the southern slopes. The highlands of the Lesser Caucasus Mountains in Armenia, Azerbaijan, and Georgia are marked by sharp temperature contrasts between the summer and winter months due to a more continental climate.

Precipitation increases from east to west in most areas. Elevation plays an important role in the Caucasus and mountains generally receive higher amounts of precipitation than low-lying areas. The north-eastern regions (Dagestan) and the southern portions of the Lesser Caucasus Mountains are the driest. Western parts of the Caucasus Mountains are marked by high amounts of precipitation. The southern slopes of the Greater Caucasus Mountain Range receive higher amounts of precipitation than the northern slopes. The absolute maximum annual precipitation is  around the Mt. Mtirala area which lies on the Meskheti Range in Ajaria. The precipitation of the Lesser Caucasus Mountain Range (Southern Georgia, Armenia, western Azerbaijan), not including the Meskheti Range, varies from 300- annually.

The Caucasus Mountains are known for the high amount of snowfall, although many regions which are not located along the windward slopes do not receive nearly as much snow. This is especially true for the Lesser Caucasus Mountains which are somewhat isolated from the moist influences coming in from the Black Sea and receive considerably less precipitation (in the form of snow) than the Greater Caucasus Mountains. The Greater Caucasus Mountains (especially the southwestern slopes) are marked by heavy snowfall. Avalanches are common from November to April.

Snow cover in several regions (Svaneti and northern Abkhazia) may reach .

Landscape

The Caucasus Mountains have a varied landscape which changes according to elevation and distance from large bodies of water. The region contains biomes ranging from subtropical lowland marshes and forests to glaciers (Western and Central Caucasus), and highland semideserts, steppes, and alpine meadows in the south (mainly in Armenia and Azerbaijan).

The northern slopes of the Greater Caucasus Mountains are covered by oak, hornbeam, maple, and ash forests at lower elevations while birch and pine forests take over at higher elevations. Some of the lowest areas of the region are covered by steppes and grasslands. The slopes of the North-western Greater Caucasus (Kabardino-Balkaria, Cherkessia, etc.) also contain spruce and fir forests. The southeastern slopes of the Greater Caucasus Mountains are covered by beech, oak, maple, hornbeam, and ash forests. Beech forests tend to dominate in higher locations. The south-western slopes of the Greater Caucasus are covered by Colchian forests (oak, buxus, beech, chestnut, hornbeam, elm) at lower elevations with coniferous and mixed forests (spruce, fir and beech) taking over at higher elevations.

The northern and western slopes of the Lesser Caucasus Mountains are characterized both by Colchian and other deciduous forests at lower elevations while mixed and coniferous forests (mainly spruce and fir) dominate at higher elevations. Beech forests are also common at higher elevations. The highest areas of the region too contains alpine grasslands. Volcanic and other rock formations are common throughout the region. The volcanic zone extends over a large area from southern Georgia into Armenia and southwestern Azerbaijan. Some of the prominent peaks of the region include Mt. Aragats, Didi Abuli, Samsari, and others. The area is characterized by volcanic plateaus, lava flows, volcanic lakes, volcanic cones and other features. The Lesser Caucasus Mountains lack the type of glaciers and glacial features that are common on the Greater Caucasus Mountain Range.

History

Crossing the Caucasus Mountain range was an important section of the northern arm of the Silk Route. Tusheti shepherds of Georgia have been herding livestock to seasonal grazing grounds, a practice known as transhumance for over 10,000 years.There was one pass on the southeast end in Derbent (known as the Caspian Gates or Gates of Alexander), and multiple passes throughout the range: Jvari Pass at 2379 m and above the Darial Gorge on the Georgian Military Road, Mamison Pass on the Ossetian Military Road at 2911 m, and Roki Tunnel at 2310 m.

Image gallery

See also
 Zagros Mountains

Notes

References

 Parts of this article are from the NASA Earth Observatory:

Further reading

External links

 
 
 
 

Caucasus
01
01
Caucasus04
Caucasus04
Mountain ranges of Asia
Mountain ranges of Europe
Mountain ranges of Armenia
Mountain ranges of Azerbaijan
Mountain ranges of Georgia (country)
Mountain ranges of Iran
Mountain ranges of Russia
Mountain ranges of Turkey
 01
 01
Physiographic provinces
Landforms of Kabardino-Balkaria
Landforms of Karachay-Cherkessia